This is a list of cities in the United Kingdom that are officially designated such . It lists those places that have been granted city status by letters patent or royal charter. There are currently a total of 76 such cities in the United Kingdom: 55 in England, eight in Scotland, seven in Wales, and six in Northern Ireland. Of these, 24 in England, two in Wales, and two in Northern Ireland have Lord Mayors; four in Scotland have Lord Provosts. In some cases, the area holding city status does not coincide with the built up area or conurbation of which it forms part. In Greater London, for example, the City of London and that of Westminster each hold city status separately but no other local authority has been granted city status, nor has Greater London as a whole. In other cases, such as the Cities of Canterbury and Lancaster, the status applies to a local government district which extends over a number of towns and rural areas outside the main settlement proper. In England, the status sometimes applies to civil parishes, such as the City of Ripon; though the status may not apply to the local government district which share their name. For example, the civil parishes of Lichfield and Chichester each hold city status, but the Lichfield District and the Chichester District, in which they are situated, respectively, do not.

The list does not include places like Luton, Northampton and Reading which, despite having populations of over 200,000, have not been awarded city status and thus formally remain as towns.

As of 2022, there are currently 5 ceremonial counties which contain 3 cities - Cambridgeshire, Essex, Hampshire, West Midlands and West Yorkshire.

In the British Overseas Territories and Crown Dependencies, there are currently four cities. The number will increase as part of the Platinum Jubilee celebrations, as Gibraltar, Hamilton in Bermuda, Jamestown in St Helena and Stanley in the Falkland Islands will be joined by Douglas in the Isle of Man.

History 

The initial cities of Britain were the fortified settlements organised by the Romans as the capitals of the Celtic tribes under Roman rule. The British clerics of the early Middle Ages later preserved a traditional list of the "28 Cities" which was mentioned by Gildas and listed by Nennius.

The title of city was initially informal and, into the 20th century, royal charters were considered to recognise city status rather than to grant it. The usual criterion in early modern Britain was the presence of a cathedral, particularly after King Henry VIII granted letters patent establishing six new cities when he established a series of new dioceses in the 1540s as part of the English Reformation. No new cities were created between the 16th and 19th centuries, but following the Industrial Revolution and the accompanying population boom and growth in urbanisation, new sees were established at Ripon (1836) and Manchester (1847); their councils began to style them cities immediately. Inverness in Scotland was even refused a charter at the time of the Jubilee honours of 1897, in part because it would have drawn more attention to the other traditional "cities" still not formally chartered as such.

Beginning in the mid-19th century, however, the process became more formal. A visit by Queen Victoria in 1851 prompted Manchester to petition Parliament for recognition of its status. Ripon followed in the 1860s, and a series of hitherto informal "cities" were formally recognised in the 1880s and 1890s. On the basis of its size, importance, and regular government, Belfast was elevated in spite of its lack of a cathedral in 1888; other large municipalities followed, while smaller applicants began to be rejected. King Edward VII and the Home Office established three criteria for future applicants in 1907—a minimum population of 300,000, a good record of local government, and a "local metropolitan character" but these criteria were not made public, and following Leicester's successful elevation in 1919 a series of exceptions were made. The 1972 Local Government Act effectively eliminated all authorities holding city status outside Greater London on 1 April 1974; most of their replacements were confirmed in their predecessor's status—even in cases such as the City of Carlisle, where much of the local authority area is undeveloped countryside—but the Borough of Medway was not permitted to continue Rochester's title. In recent times there have been competitions for new grants of city status. Towns or councils that claim city status or add "city" to their name have been known to be rebuked by the Advertising Standards Authority.

The cities of Scotland and Ireland were treated separately. Scottish towns irregularly applied the description to themselves, but were formally organised as royal burghs; the special rights of these were preserved by Article XXI of the Treaty of Union which established the single state of Great Britain in 1707. Edinburgh and Glasgow were confirmed as cities "by ancient usage" in the 18th century, as was Aberdeen, and this was later reconfirmed in the Act enlarging the burgh in 1891. Dundee was granted letters patent in 1889 and Elgin and Perth were recognised as cities by the Home Office in 1972, before the privilege was removed by the Scottish Local Government Act of 1973.

In Ireland, only the seat of the primate at Armagh was accorded city status by ancient usage, and this status was abolished by the Irish Municipal Corporations Act of 1840. All other cities have been those explicitly recognised as such.

List of cities

Map of the cities 

Below is a map of the 76 cities in the United Kingdom of Great Britain and Northern Ireland. Also shown is the one future city in a UK Crown Dependency, Douglas in the Isle of Man. (For cities in UK Overseas Territories, see below.)

32 cities have a Lord Provost (in Scotland) or a Lord Mayor (in England, Wales, and Northern Ireland), see List of lord mayoralties and lord provostships in the United Kingdom.

The six cities where the Lord Mayor or Lord Provost has the right to the style The Right Honourable are indicated in BOLD ITALICS: York, the City of London, Edinburgh, Glasgow (since 1912), Belfast (since 1923), and Cardiff (since 1956).

Overseas Territories and Crown Dependencies 

The UK Overseas Territories and UK Crown Dependencies do not form part of the United Kingdom. Association of city status with cathedrals ended in 1865. There are presently four cities in the Overseas Territories, and Douglas in the Isle of Man, a Crown Dependency, is due to receive city status in 2023.

Map of cities in Overseas Territories and Crown Dependencies

See also 

 City status in the United Kingdom
 Centre for Cities
 List of lord mayoralties and lord provostships in the United Kingdom
 List of towns in the United Kingdom
 List of urban areas in the United Kingdom
 City status in Ireland
 List of smallest cities in the United Kingdom
 Royal burgh

Table notes 

  The status bearers of these cities changed on 1 April 2009 due to local government reforms. Salisbury became a civil parish, while charter trustees were formed for the former district council areas of Chester and Durham in the new unitary authorities of Cheshire West and Chester and County Durham respectively.
 City status confirmed by Letters Patent issued under the Great Seal dated 1 April 1974.
 City status confirmed by Letters Patent issued under the Great Seal dated 25 June 1974.
 City status confirmed by Letters Patent issued under the Great Seal dated 28 May 1974.
 Bath Abbey and Westminster Abbey are no longer cathedrals.
 Coventry has had three cathedrals: the first, St Mary's, from 1043 to 1539 (it became a cathedral in 1102); the second, St Michael's, from 1918 to 1940, when it was destroyed by German bombardment; and its replacement, also St Michael's, built alongside the old cathedral, consecrated in 1962.
 Note that the City of London covers only the "square mile", and is usually just referred to as "the City". The larger conurbation of Greater London has no city charter, and consists of the City of London, the City of Westminster and 31 other London boroughs. This can be compared to the City of Brussels, within Brussels.
 City status was confirmed by Letters Patent dated 9 July 1974. The city status extends to the entire district, although the district council calls itself "St Albans District Council" or "St Albans City and District".
 Letters Patent under the Great Seal conferring City Status were issued to the unitary authority of York on 1 April 1996, confirming the right of the Lord Mayor to be styled "Right Honourable", in continuation to those granted to the previous City Council abolished 31 March 1996.
 Letters Patent under the Great Seal were issued on 29 March 1996 ordaining that the counties of Swansea and Cardiff should have the status of cities from 1 April 1996. The counties replaced the previous district councils which had enjoyed city status.
 According to the Municipal Year Book, 1972 the royal burghs of Perth and Elgin officially enjoyed city status. The royal burghs of Brechin, Dunfermline and Kirkwall had also been officially described as "cities". As all burghs were abolished in 1975, these areas are now often called "former cities". Although Brechin does not have city status, the community council formed for the area uses the title "City of Brechin and District".
 Armagh had previously enjoyed city status, with St Patrick's Cathedral the seat of the metropolitan primate of all Ireland. The city status was lost in 1840 when the city corporation was abolished. However, the successor urban district council and district council frequently used the title of city without official sanction prior to 1994.
 City Status confirmed by Letters Patent issued under the Great Seal dated 18 March 1975.
 City status granted by Letters Patent dated 7 June 1977.
 City status granted to the "Town of Newport in the County Borough of Newport" and the "Town of Preston" by Letters Patent dated 15 May 2002.
 Letters Patent dated 31 January 2001 ordained that "the Towns of Brighton and Hove shall have the status of a City".
 Letters Patent dated 31 January 2001 ordained that "the Town of Wolverhampton shall have the status of a City".
 Letters Patent dated 4 November 1980 ordained that the "Town of Lichfield shall have the status of a City". A town council had been constituted in 1980 leading to the dissolution of the Charter Trustees of the City of Lichfield.
 City status granted by Letters Patent dated 23 March 1992.
 City status was conferred on Hereford Town Council 11 October 2000. The status had previously been confirmed to the district council formed in 1974. When that council was abolished in 1996 charter trustees were formed for the City of Hereford. On the formation of a town council for Hereford in April 2000 the charter trustees were dissolved, and the city status temporarily lapsed.
 St David's historically had city status because of the presence of St David's Cathedral. In 1849 it was noted that the city had no municipal corporation: There was however a recognised "city" in which a mayor had limited jurisdiction. A Royal Commission appointed in 1876 reported that the corporation had long been extinct, and the city was formally abolished in 1886 under the provisions of the Municipal Corporations Act 1883. Letters Patent dated 16 September 1994 ordained that the "Town of St. David's shall have the status of a City".
 The title of City was used "by courtesy" after 1550 when Westminster ceased to be the see of a bishop. By Letters Patent dated 27 October 1900 city status was conferred on the newly created Metropolitan Borough of Westminster from 1 November. This status was continued on the creation of the City of Westminster as a London borough in 1965.
 A letter from the Home Secretary to the Mayor of Leicester dated 14 June 1919, confirming that the city status would be bestowed, noted that this was a "restoration to your ancient town of its former status of a city".
 Letters Patent dated 10 December 1969.
 Letters Patent dated 21 April 1926.
 Letters Patent dated 21 March 1951.
 Letters Patent dated 14 May 1937.
 Letters Patent dated 18 October 1928.
 Letters Patent dated 5 June 1925.
 Letters Patent dated 28 October 1905, which also granted the title of Lord Mayor.
 Warrant issued 28 January 1889 that Letters Patent be issued under the Seal appointed by the treaty of union to be used in place of the Great Seal of Scotland, ordaining and declaring that the Burgh of Dundee shall be a City, and shall be called and styled "The City of Dundee".
 Burghs of Old Aberdeen and Woodside and the district of Torry incorporated as the City and Royal Burgh of Aberdeen by the Aberdeen Corporation Act 1891 (54 & 55 Vict. c. cxxiv).
 The present council areas are designated "cities" by virtue of the Local Government etc. (Scotland) Act 1994, which also reserves the post of Lord Provost for the convener of the four councils. The previous local government districts and district councils created by the Local Government (Scotland) Act 1973 enjoyed the same privileges.
 Letters Patent dated 14 January 1889.
 Letters Patent dated 29 March 1853.
 Letters Patent dated 1 April 2009. City status had been held prior to this date (and since 1974) by the Charter Trustees of the City of New Sarum. The city of Salisbury's formal name was New Sarum (see also: Old Sarum) from 1227 until 2009.
 Letters Patent dated 28 August 1877.
 Letters Patent dated 1 June 2012 "to ordain that the Town of Chelmsford in the County of Essex and the Town of St Asaph in the County of Denbighshire shall have the status of a City".
  [2015] Localities (Glasgow)
 Legally, the city and county are called "Londonderry", while the local government district is called "Derry". See Derry/Londonderry name dispute.
 Letters Patent dated 14 June 2022.
 Letters Patent dated 15 August 2022.
 Letters Patent dated 30 September 1842
 Letters Patent dated 1 September 2022
 Letters Patent dated 5 September 2022
 Letters Patent dated 26 January 2022
 Letters Patent dated 28 July 2022
 Letters Patent dated 7 September 2022, with effect from 1 November 2022
 Letters Patent dated 22 November 2022

Notes

References

Sources 

 

List
United Kingdom
 
Cities
Lists of cities by population

pl:Miasta ze statusem City w Wielkiej Brytanii